The Third Three Years is a compilation album by singer-songwriter Frank Turner, released 24 November 2014 through Xtra Mile Recordings.

Much like its predecessors The First Three Years and The Second Three Years, the album comprises material recorded since the release of the latter of those compilations. None of these recordings have appeared on any of Turner's studio albums, and include covers, alternate and live versions of previously released songs, demos, and b-sides.

Track listing

Frank Turner albums
2014 compilation albums